The 1957 Bulgarian Cup was the 17th season of the Bulgarian Cup (in this period the tournament was named Cup of the Soviet Army). Levski Sofia won the competition, beating Spartak Pleven 2–1 in the final at the Vasil Levski National Stadium in Sofia.

First round

|}

Second round

|-
!colspan="3" style="background-color:#D0F0C0; text-align:left;" |Replay

|}

Quarter-finals

|}

Semi-finals

|}

Final

Details

References

1957
1956–57 domestic association football cups
Cup